The large-billed leaf warbler (Phylloscopus magnirostris) is a species of leaf warbler (family Phylloscopidae). It was formerly included in the "Old World warbler" assemblage.

Breeding in central China and the Himalayas, it winters in the Western Ghats and associated hill ranges. It is found in dense vegetation and is more often heard than seen. The two note dir-tee call with the second note much higher is distinctive. They call often and at regular intervals.

References

large-billed leaf warbler
Birds of the Himalayas
Birds of Central China
large-billed leaf warbler
large-billed leaf warbler